Cotton and Maple Streets School is a historic school building located at Reading, Berks County, Pennsylvania.  It was built in 1902-1903, and is a two-story, brick and sandstone building in the Richardsonian Romanesque style.  It features terra cotta decorative elements and measures 210 feet by 201 feet.  It has a rear service wing.  The building became a clubhouse in the 1940s.

It was listed on the National Register of Historic Places in 1986.

References

Buildings and structures in Reading, Pennsylvania
School buildings on the National Register of Historic Places in Pennsylvania
Richardsonian Romanesque architecture in Pennsylvania
School buildings completed in 1903
Schools in Berks County, Pennsylvania
National Register of Historic Places in Reading, Pennsylvania
1903 establishments in Pennsylvania